"Somethin' 4 da Honeyz" is the second single released from Montell Jordan's debut album, This Is How We Do It (1995). Produced by Oji Pierce, "Somethin' 4 da Honeyz" was the follow-up to Montell's number-one hit, "This Is How We Do It". The song became his second consecutive hit, peaking at 21 on the Billboard Hot 100, and was certified gold by the Recording Industry Association of America in September 1995 for shipments of over 500,000 copies. The official remix entitled the "Human Rhythm Remix" was produced by Derrick Edmondson and featured an appearance by Redman. Both the original and remix had promotional music videos released. The track sampled "Summer Madness" by Kool & the Gang.

Track listing

A-Side
 "Somethin' 4 da Honeyz" (radio version) – 4:02  
 "Somethin' 4 da Honeyz" (Human Rhythm remix) – 3:57  
 "Somethin' 4 da Honeyz" (Human Rhythm instrumental) – 3:57

B-Side
 "This Is How We Do It" (Studio Ton radio mix) – 3:42  
 "This Is How We Do It" (Funkmaster Flex radio mix) – 4:33  
 "This Is How We Do It" (Puff Daddy radio mix) – 4:23

Charts and certifications

Weekly charts

Year-end charts

Certifications

Release history

References

1995 singles
Def Jam Recordings singles
Island Records singles
Montell Jordan songs
Songs written by Montell Jordan